Cameron "Cam" Blackwood is a British record producer, songwriter and musician.

He has previously been employed in various London recording studios including Roundhouse Studios in Farringdon, Miloco Studios, and Townhouse Studios in Chiswick, and has worked from his own studio (Voltaire Road Studios, Clapham) since 2010.

Managed by Echo Beach Management, his credits include George Ezra, London Grammar, Billie Marten,  Jack Savoretti, British Sea Power, Alabama 3, Florence and the Machine, CSS and We Are Scientists.

He has previously been a part of the selection panel of the Sky Academy Arts Scholarship.

Awards and nominations

Discography

Studio albums

Extended plays

Singles

Other charted songs

References 

Cam Blackwood talking about producing young artists
Review of Darlia – Queen of Hearts
Review of George Ezra – Budapest
Review of George Ezra – Did you hear the Rain

External links
 Big Life Producer Management
 Voltaire Road Studios
 Ethersound News Article
 Academy of Contemporary Music Article
 Blues Musician Article
 iLive Digital Mixing Desks
 Discogs Credits

British audio engineers
British record producers
Living people
Year of birth missing (living people)